The GWR 4073 Class 5043 Earl of Mount Edgcumbe is a steam locomotive of the GWR 'Castle' Class, built in March 1936. It was originally named Barbury Castle, and was renamed Earl of Mount Edgcumbe in September 1937 (the name coming from the GWR Dukedog Class no 3200/9000). It had a double chimney and 4 row superheater fitted in October 1958.

Its first shed allocation was Old Oak Common; from June 1952 to February 1956 it was based at Carmarthen, before returning again to Old Oak Common. Like all other steam locomotives based there, with the dieselisation of Cardiff Canton TMD it was transferred to Cardiff East Dock shed in September 1962, its last shed allocation.

It was withdrawn in December 1963, and acquired by Woodham Brothers scrapyard in Barry, South Wales in June 1964.

Renaming and Double Chimney
When built in March 1936 the engine was named Barbury Castle and it carried this name for the first eighteen months of its working life before being renamed by the GWR to Earl of Mount Edgcumbe in September 1937, this name it would carry for the rest of its working career. Its original Barbury Castle name would later be used by 5095 which was built in 1939.

In 1958 it became one of sixty-five engines to be fitted with a double chimney which was undertaken between 1956 and 1961. It is one of only two Castles in preservation to be fitted with a double chimney, the other engine being 7029 Clun Castle.

Allocations 
The shed locations of 5043 during her career with the GWR & BR on particular dates.

Preservation 
It was sold to the then Birmingham Railway Museum and left as the 43rd departure from Barry in September 1973. Many of its parts were removed for safekeeping and the locomotive was stored, initially as a spare boiler for 7029 "Clun Castle". In 1996,  Birmingham Railway Museum trustees announced the  project to restore Earl of Mount  Edgcumbe to main line running condition. The proposal was to restore the locomotive to late 1950s condition, with newly constructed Hawksworth tender and BR double chimney.

In 1998, the boiler was removed from the frames and prepared for inspection, with welding undertaken by Babock. In 1999, descaling commenced on the front end of the frames in preparation for repair. The axleboxes were removed and examined, and found to be in excellent condition, requiring only examination, repair and cleaning. In 2000, 5043 was moved into Tyseley Locomotive Works. The engineering team scraped down the frames, which once clean showed them to be in good condition, and given a coat of anti-corrosive green paint. The bushes for the coupling rods were cast, machined and fitted. While checking the inside crossheads for repair and refitting, which were found to have been fitted at one time to sister GWR Castle 5080 Defiant. The wheelsets were prepared for cleaning and refitting, and the bogie repaired and repainted, with fitting undertaken in 2003. TPWS equipment was acquired and fitted. In late 2007 the boiler was steamed up and approved, allowing 5043 to move under its own steam on 3 October 2008.

On Saturday 16 October 2010, 5043 hauled a southbound excursion over the Settle-Carlisle line. On the climb to Ais Gill summit, 5043 is credited with generating an estimated 2030 edhp. As of Jan 2019 this is believed to be a power output record for the entire GWR Castle class, and also exceeds the maximum power outputs of the Western Region diesel-hydraulic locomotives built to replace them.

On Saturday 10 May 2014, 5043 took an anniversary train from Tyseley to Plymouth to mark 50 years since the original 748 train in 1964. Fellow resident 7029 Clun Castle worked the original train in 1964, working the Plymouth to Bristol section of the tour. And on that tour in 1964 she set a record of travelling non stop from Plymouth to Bristol in 133 minutes, 5043 working the anniversary train in 2014 broke that record by just two minutes.

The locomotive has since returning to the mainline worked various special trains, alongside visiting Stratford upon Avon, Didcot, Cardiff and other locations over the former GWR system she has also visited locations and worked down routes she would never have visited or run along during her career with the Great Western Railway or even British Railways as GWR engines were known to be much wider than engines on other regions. New locations she has visited so far in preservation include: Liverpool, Llandudno, Chester, Carlisle, Salisbury, London Marylebone, Glasgow, Edinburgh and York.

Preservation Photos

References

External links

 'Castle' class details, 5000 - 5049 Great Western Archive
 A GWR Castle at speed - 5043 Earl of Mount Edgcumbe racing alongside the M5 Ben Jervis, via YouTube

5043
Railway locomotives introduced in 1936
5043
Locomotives saved from Woodham Brothers scrapyard
Standard gauge steam locomotives of Great Britain